Caudiel is a municipality in the comarca of Alto Palancia, Castellón, Valencia, Spain.

Geography 
The surrounding municipalities are Benafer, Fuente la Reina, Gaibiel, Higueras, Jérica, Montán, Pavías, Pina de Montalgrao, Villanueva de Viver and San Agustín. The population in 2018 was reported as 648.

Demographics

References 

Municipalities in the Province of Castellón
Alto Palancia